The Camí de Cavalls is an ancient path of  that encircles the island of Menorca, Spain. This long-distance walking route is the GR 223 of the Senderos de Gran Recorrido network in Spain and it is also used to reach some of the most inaccessible beaches of Menorca.

History 

It is widely accepted that the Camí de Cavalls was built in order to connect the watchtowers, fortresses and cannons distributed along the coast of the island and to make the transport of troops and artillery easier. However, the date of its origin is not so clear. The most accepted theory attributes it is the French invaders during the different periods they lived in the island, but according to some studies, it could have been created in the 14th century.

Since its original function was the defence and the control of the island, it was patrolled by soldiers mounted on Menorquin horses, hence the word cavalls (meaning "horses" in Catalan) in the name of the path.

Restoration 
During decades part of the path belonged to private properties and could not be used by everybody. However, after an agreement between the island's government and the landlords, the path became public. Then, the Government started the restoration of the whole path, spending €934,977.37 in a first stage and €800,159 in a second stage completed in May 2011.

Stages 
The path is divided in 20 different stages, each of them between 5 and 14 km. All the start and arrival points can be gained access to by road traffic, making possible to cover only one or some stages of the path at a time.

Events 
Since the whole path is restored, activities and events around it are arising.

The Trail Menorca Camí de Cavalls was held for the first time between 18 and 20 May 2012 and 140 participants took part in the five different races of this event: Trail Cami de Cavalls 185.3 km, Trail Costa Nord – 94.2 km (North coast only), Trail Costa Sud – 91 km (south coast only), Trekking Costa Nord – 46.6 km and Trekking Costa Sud – 43.5 km.

References

External links 

 Menorca Walking Holidays. Camí de Cavalls
 The Camí de Cavalls stage by stage. Hiking in Menorca. Discovering Menorca
 Information about Camí de Cavalls GR223 Includes high detail maps in PDF available to download.
 Menorca the Guide Information, maps and directions for sections of the Cami de Cavalls and other walks in Menorca.
 Maps of the Came de Cavalls Menorca Official maps in an easy to use 'Google' like format. Please note I have found some of these maps are not very accurate.
 Durations, lengths and difficulty of all 20 sections

Geography of Menorca